David Woods (23 January 1944 – 1 June 2017) was an Australian water polo player. He competed at the 1972 Summer Olympics and the 1976 Summer Olympics. In 2010, he was inducted into the Water Polo Australia Hall of Fame.

References

External links
 

1944 births
2017 deaths
Australian male water polo players
Olympic water polo players of Australia
Water polo players at the 1972 Summer Olympics
Water polo players at the 1976 Summer Olympics
Place of birth missing